Eyeless in Gaza is a bestselling novel by Aldous Huxley, first published in 1936. The title is taken from a phrase in John Milton's Samson Agonistes:
 ...  Promise was that I
 Should Israel from Philistian yoke deliver;
Ask for this great deliverer now, and find him
Eyeless in Gaza at the Mill with slaves ...

The title of the book, like Milton's poem, recalls the biblical story of Samson: he was captured by the Philistines, his eyes were burned out and he was taken to Gaza, where he was forced to work at grinding grain in a mill.

The chapters of the novel are not ordered chronologically. Huxley's biographer, Sybille Bedford, whom Huxley knew personally (they were neighbours in the south of France), claims in her fictional memoir Jigsaw that two of the novel's characters – Mary Amberley, a drug addict, and her daughter – were partly inspired by Bedford and her mother, who was addicted to morphine.

Plot
The novel focuses on four periods in the life of a socialite named Anthony Beavis between the 1890s (when he is a young boy) and 1936 – but not in chronological order. It describes Beavis's experiences as he goes through school, college and various romantic affairs; the meaninglessness of upper-class life during these times; and Beavis's gradual disillusionment with high society, brought to a head by a friend's suicide. He then begins to seek a source of meaning, and seems to find it when he discovers pacifism and then mysticism.

Critical reception
The English journalist Simon Heffer has called the novel Huxley's best book and his only "great novel". According to Heffer, the book both harkens back to Huxley's early satires and links to the more serious and philosophical concerns of his later novels. Formally, the novel uses a modernist, stream of consciousness approach, but based in fact, unlike the novels of Woolf, Proust and Joyce, whose narrators' memories are unreliable. Heffer writes that the novel explores the tension between wartime and pacifism in a particularly productive way, that Huxley is a "sophisticated, original English man of letters" who deserves a reevaluation, and that this novel is a good place to start. In Strictly English, Heffer's guide to writing clearly, he recommends Eyeless in Gaza as containing examples of what he considers to be Huxley's masterful use of parentheses (both brackets and dashes) and of the single dash. The blogger Josh Ronsen has created a table of the novel's events, rearranged in chronological order.

Adaptation
The novel was adapted by Robin Chapman as a BBC television mini-series in five episodes, which aired in 1971.

References

Further reading

 Bedford, Sybille, Aldous Huxley: A biography - 1973 - the standard, two-volume authorised biography of Huxley

External links
 

1936 British novels
Novels by Aldous Huxley
Chatto & Windus books
Nonlinear narrative novels